Alan Tracy is a fictional character who first appeared in the 1960s British Supermarionation television series Thunderbirds, its film sequels Thunderbirds Are Go (1966) and Thunderbird 6 (1968), as well as the TV remake Thunderbirds Are Go. The character also appeared in the 2004 live-action film adaptation, Thunderbirds.

Thunderbirds (1965-1966)

Background
The face of the Alan Tracy puppet was modelled on actor Robert Reed. Matt Zimmerman voiced the character for all but one of his 1960s appearances; since Zimmerman was a late addition to the cast, Ray Barrett provided Alan's voice for his debut appearance in the series opener, "Trapped in the Sky".

Zimmerman was recommended to producers Gerry and Sylvia Anderson by David Holliday, the voice of Virgil Tracy. In an interview, Zimmerman remembered of his casting: "They were having great difficulty in casting the part of Alan Tracy as they wanted a certain sound for him ...As I walked in [Sylvia Anderson] looked at me and said, 'Don't talk! Oh, my god, you've got those big eyes and the cleft in the chin and the cheek bones, and if you were blond you'd look very much like Alan.' She said, 'Now, sit down. What's your name again?' And I said, 'My name is Matt Zimmerman and I'm from Detroit, Michigan,' and she said, 'That's the voice!' And that's how I got the job."

Character biography
The fifth and youngest son of Jeff Tracy (the founder and financier of International Rescue), Alan is named after American astronaut Alan Shepard. Sources differ on the subject of Alan's age and date of birth; in the Thunderbird Fact File, his birthday is stated to be 12 March 2005 or 2044, making him 21 years old during the events of most of the series (he turns 22 in the episode "Attack of the Alligators!"). An accomplished sportsman and former racing driver, he can at times be bad-tempered and reckless. Alan studied at Colorado University, where his natural impetuousness led to a clash with authorities over the launch (and subsequent crash) of an unsanctioned, self-built rocket. His father took charge of the situation, steering the interest toward more constructive ends, ultimately resulting in Alan's role as astronaut and principal pilot of Thunderbird 3.

The episode "Moveand You're Dead" reveals that Alan is additionally a skilled racing car driver, but that he gave up this career to assume his responsibilities within International Rescue. In "Atlantic Inferno", Alan pilots Thunderbird 1, assuming his brother Scott's role of flying to the danger zone and co-ordinating the rescue operation. Alan comments on how different it is from operating Thunderbird 3, prompting Scott to remind him to "bring [Thunderbird 1] back in one piece". In the film Thunderbird 6, he shoots three hijackers, becoming one of only three members of IR (with Scott and Gordon) to kill an enemy. The most romantic of all the Tracy brothers, Alan is involved with Tin-Tin, the daughter of Kyrano, caretaker of Tracy Island. However, despite his passion for her, he is seen to be attracted to IR's London agent, Lady Penelope Creighton-Ward, in the episode "The Perils of Penelope" and the film Thunderbirds Are Go.

Reception
Zimmerman has spoken warmly of Alan's conception and development, commenting that "Alan was the one character that showed emotion. He used to get upset if he couldn't go on a mission, he got jealous if Tin-Tin talked to another man, and he was a very real character." Science-fiction writer John Peel considers Alan evidence of the series' aptitude for strong characterisation, summing up his character as "love-struck and annoying", yet simultaneously "so human". Martin Anderson of the entertainment website Den of Geek describes Alan in less enthusiastic terms; according to Anderson, the character "was unfortunately relegated to the role of designated driver" for the purposes of ferrying supplies from Tracy Island to John Tracy on board the Thunderbird 5 space station.

Mark Radcliffe argues that the original series character is overshadowed by Scott and Virgil, who direct most of IR's rescue efforts: "Poor Alan, despite having a rocket with much cooler fins than [Thunderbird 1], would then be dispatched to sort of see that everything was going OK. Pretty demeaning work for a guy who's been to puppet Colorado University." The seeming lack of logic on the part of Jeff Tracy in entrusting Thunderbird 3 (the largest mobile Thunderbird machine) to Alan (the youngest of his five sons) has also been questioned.

Thunderbirds (2004 film)

In the live-action Thunderbirds, Alan is again demonstrated to be attracted to Tin-Tin; he was portrayed by Brady Corbet. In this film, Alan is 14 years old and attends a boarding school in the United States.

Reception
Graeme Clark, in a negative review of the 2004 film for the website The Spinning Image, writes that Brady Corbet's Alan is the only Tracy brother to be given a distinct personality; by contrast, his siblings are "totally interchangeable". A retrospective on Den of Geek draws parallels between the new Alan and the protagonist of the Harry Potter novel and film series, alluding to a reversal of the story concept "of a boy at home thrust into an adventurous world".

Thunderbirds Are Go (2015-2020)

Like previous series, Alan is still the pilot of Thunderbird 3. Similar to his 2004 counterpart, he is once again a teenager and is sometimes treated like a kid by his brothers. On some occasions, he, is joined on board Thunderbird 3 by Scott or Kayo (the series' counterpart of Tin-Tin). Alan's equipment includes an orbital conveyance platform which lets him get closer to things such as the Sat-Mine machine in episode 3 "Space Race".

Alan's immaturity is shown by his near-constant need to play some sort of zombie apocalypse computer game (shown in the episode "Slingshot") in Thunderbird 3, and a constant addiction to sleep. However, he appears younger than Kayo and as such does not show a lot of attraction to her, in fact he sees her more as a sister. It appears as though Scott may have some attraction to her, though this is debatable as Kayo and Alan gave each other looks in the episode "Home on the Range". Over the course of the series he becomes more mature on missions and continue being help for his brothers and allies.

References

Bibliography

External links
 Thunderbirds characters

American male characters in television
Fictional astronauts
Fictional aviators
Fictional racing drivers
Film characters introduced in 1966
Male characters in animated series
Male characters in film
Alan Shepard
Teenage characters in film
Teenage characters in television
Television characters introduced in 1965
Thunderbirds (TV series) characters
Fictional people from the 21st-century